Buddhism in Norway has existed since the beginning of the 1970s, after immigration from countries with Buddhist populations, mainly Vietnam. Buddhistforbundet (The Buddhist Federation) in Norway was established as a religious society in 1979 by two Buddhist groups (The Zen School and Karma Tashi Ling buddhistsenter) who wanted to create a common organization to preserve issues of common interest. As of 2013, there are over 30 to 50 thousand (between 0.7% and up to 1% of the total population) registered Buddhists in Norway. Around 5% of them are ethnic Norwegians.

Population

By county

By region

References

External links 
 Buddhist Federation of Norway (European Buddhist Union)
 Buddhism in Norway
 BUDDHISTFORBUNDET
 Buddhism Today - Buddhism in Norway, by Haavard Lorentzen

 
Norway
Nor